The Josiah Andrews House is an historic building located in Des Moines, Iowa, United States.  It is a 2½-story, rectangular, frame, front gable dwelling.  It features Stick Style strips on the gable end, and brackets along the cornice.  The property on which it stands is part of one of ten plats that were owned by Drake University.  The university sold the lot to J. and H.L. Andrews in 1896, and they built this house at that time.  Its significance is attributed to the effect of the university's innovative financing techniques upon the settlement of the area around the campus.  The house was listed on the National Register of Historic Places in 1988.

References

Houses completed in 1896
Victorian architecture in Iowa
Houses in Des Moines, Iowa
National Register of Historic Places in Des Moines, Iowa
Houses on the National Register of Historic Places in Iowa